Eduard Odinets (born 27 May 1976 in Kohtla-Järve) is an Estonian politician. He is a member of XIV Riigikogu.

2000–2009 and again from 2021, he is a member of Social Democratic Party.

References

Living people
1976 births
Social Democratic Party (Estonia) politicians
Members of the Riigikogu, 2019–2023
People from Kohtla-Järve